Holiday Bowl or Holidaybowl may refer to:
 Holiday Bowl, an annual American college football bowl game in San Diego, California
 Holiday Bowl (building), a former bowling alley on Crenshaw Boulevard in Los Angeles, California
 Holiday Bowl (NAIA), NAIA division I football national championship game from 1957 to 1960